Janice May "Jan" Bedford (born 15 May 1945), also known as Janice Pyke, is a retired Australian gymnast. She competed at the 1964 Summer Olympics in all artistic gymnastics events and finished in 10th place with the Australian team. Her best individual results were 62nd places on the floor and balance beam.

References

External links
 
 
 

1945 births
Living people
Australian female artistic gymnasts
Olympic gymnasts of Australia
Gymnasts at the 1964 Summer Olympics
20th-century Australian women